Menachem Z. Rosensaft (born 1948) an attorney in New York and the founding chairman of the International Network of Children of Jewish Holocaust Survivors, is a leader of the Second Generation movement of children of Holocaust survivors. He has been described on the front page of The New York Times as one of the most prominent of the survivors' sons and daughters. He has served as national president of the Labor Zionist Alliance, and was active in the early stages of the Israeli-Palestinian peace process. As psychologist Eva Fogelman has written: "Menachem Rosensaft's moral voice has gone beyond the responsibility he felt as a child of survivors to remember and educate. He felt the need to promote peace and a tolerant State of Israel as well. He wanted to bring to justice Nazi war criminals, to fight racism and bigotry, and to work toward the continuity of the Jewish people".

In March 2009, Menachem Rosensaft was appointed as general counsel of the World Jewish Congress, the umbrella organization of Jewish communities around the world based in New York, and in October 2019 he was also appointed the WJC’s associate executive Vice President.

Since 2008, Menachem Rosensaft has been adjunct professor of law at Cornell Law School, and was formerly a Distinguished Visiting Lecturer at Syracuse University College of Law. In 2011, he was appointed lecturer in law at Columbia University Law School where he teaches a course on the law of genocide. In May 2022, he was elected chairman of the Advisory Board of the Lower Saxony Memorials Foundation which oversees World War II memorial sites throughout the German state of Lower Saxony, including the site of the Nazi concentration camp of Bergen-Belsen. He is the editor of God, Faith & Identity from the Ashes: Reflections of Children and Grandchildren of Holocaust Survivors, and The World Jewish Congress: 1936-2016. In April 2021, a volume of his poetry, Poems Born in Bergen-Belsen, was published by Kelsay Books.

Early life
The son of two survivors of the Nazi concentration camps of Auschwitz and Bergen-Belsen, Menachem Rosensaft was born on May 1, 1948, in the Displaced Persons camp of Bergen-Belsen in Germany. From 1945 until 1950, his father, Josef Rosensaft, was chairman of the Jewish Committee of the Bergen-Belsen DP camp and of the Central Jewish Committee in the British Zone of Germany. His mother, Dr. Hadassah Bimko Rosensaft, was a member of President Jimmy Carter's Commission on the Holocaust, and a founding member of the United States Holocaust Memorial Council.

Academic and professional career
Menachem Rosensaft received his B.A. degree from Johns Hopkins University in 1971, together with an M.A. degree in creative writing from the university's Writing Seminars. From 1972 until 1975, he was an adjunct lecturer in the Department of Jewish Studies at the City University of New York and assisted Professor Elie Wiesel in his courses on Holocaust literature and Hasidism. He received a second M.A. degree in modern European history from Columbia University in 1975, and in 1979, he received his J.D. degree from the Columbia University School of Law, where he was a Harlan Fiske Stone Scholar and Book Review Editor of the Columbia Journal of Transnational Law.

After clerking for two years for Whitman Knapp, United States District Court Judge for the Southern District of New York, he spent fourteen years as an international and securities litigator at several major New York law firms and at an international bank. He is multilingual, has broad experience in European, Middle Eastern, and South American legal, commercial, and political issues, and has conducted sensitive negotiations with senior government officials at both national and municipal levels.

In 1995, he became Senior International Counsel for The Ronald S. Lauder Foundation, and from 1996 to 2000 was executive vice president of the Jewish Renaissance Foundation, Inc. As a foundation executive, he was responsible for the development, coordination and funding of educational and cultural projects in Eastern and Central Europe, including the acquisition and restoration of landmark buildings for use as a Jewish cultural center in Warsaw, Poland, and developing innovative educational programs for Russian-Jewish immigrants to Germany. In 1999, he was honored by the mayor of Warsaw for "inspiring work in city planning and preservation of historical monuments".

From September 2000 until December 2003, Rosensaft was a partner in the New York office of a national law firm, representing, among other clients, the audit committee and independent directors of a New York Stock Exchange listed company in connection with an internal investigation of accounting irregularities, a related proceeding brought by the Securities and Exchange Commission, and class action litigation. In January 2004 he joined a financial services firm in New York City as special counsel, becoming its general counsel in May 2005. He played a key role in guiding the firm through a period of intense regulatory and governmental scrutiny and implementing good governance practices.

Rosensaft was appointed to the United States Holocaust Memorial Council by President Bill Clinton in 1994, and reappointed to a second five-year term in 1999, chairing its Content Committee from 1994 to 2000, its Collections and Acquisitions Committee from 1996 to 2000, and its Committee on Governance from 2000 to 2002. He was a member of the council's executive committee from 1996 until 2003. He is the editor of Life Reborn, Jewish Displaced Persons 1945-1951, published by the United States Holocaust Memorial Museum in 2001. In September 2010, President Barack Obama appointed Rosensaft to a third term on the US Holocaust Memorial Council, and reappointed him to a fourth term in January 2017.

Rosensaft has been a trustee of the Park Avenue Synagogue since 1994, and he was elected president of the synagogue in 2003. He is chairman of the editorial board of the Holocaust Survivors' Memoirs Project, a joint publishing endeavor with Yad Vashem (the Holocaust Martyrs' and Heroes' Remembrance Authority in Israel), Vice President of the American Gathering of Jewish Holocaust Survivors and their Descendants, and a member of the editorial advisory board of Moment magazine. He is a former chairman of the executive committee of the American Section of the World Jewish Congress. He was one of 45 prominent American Jews who discussed the significance of fatherhood within the context of their Jewish identity in the 2004 book, Jewish Fathers: A Legacy of Love. He received the 2003 Elie Wiesel Holocaust Remembrance Award of Israel Bonds, and was awarded the 2006 Simon Rockower Award for Excellence in Feature Writing of the American Jewish Press Association for his foreword to "Great Love Stories of the Holocaust", published in the June 2005 issue of Moment. In November 2011, he received the Distinguished Humanitarian Award from the Jewish Faculty & Staff Association of New York City College of Technology. In May 2015, he was awarded the Dr. Bernard Heller Prize by the Hebrew Union College – Jewish Institute of Religion in recognition of his decades of work on behalf of the Jewish community. He has published articles in The New York Times, The Washington Post, Newsweek, the Los Angeles Times, the International Herald Tribune, the New York Post, the New York Daily News, Tablet, Jewish Telegraphic Agency (JTA), Moment, the New York Law Journal, The National Law Journal, the New York Jewish Week, The Forward, The Jerusalem Post, Haaretz, and other publications.

Rosensaft is married to Jean Bloch Rosensaft, also the daughter of Holocaust survivors, who is Senior National Director for Public Affairs and Institutional Planning at Hebrew Union College-Jewish Institute of Religion and director of its New York museum. He is the co-author, with their daughter, Joana D. Rosensaft, of "The Early History of German-Jewish Reparations," published in the Fordham International Law Journal.

In September 1981, he was one of the founders of the International Network of Children of Jewish Holocaust Survivors and was elected the organization's first chairman. Since June 1984, he has had the title of founding chairman. Under his leadership, the International Network organized major conferences of children of survivors in New York in 1984 and Los Angeles in 1987, and in 1982, it held the first citywide rally in New York City on behalf of Ethiopian Jewry. Rosensaft also participated in the planning of and programming for the World Gathering of Jewish Holocaust Survivors in Jerusalem in June 1981, and the mass gatherings of thousands of Holocaust survivors in Washington, D.C. (1983), Philadelphia (1985), and New York (1986).

Philosophy of Holocaust Remembrance
Rosensaft's philosophy of Holocaust remembrance is greatly influenced by what he has described as Elie Wiesel's "commitment to human rights, his readiness to apply the lessons of the Holocaust to contemporary issues while at all times emphasizing its Jewish particularity." Thus, his focus has been on social and political action rather than psychological introspection. In his opening address at the first international conference of children of Holocaust survivors in New York in May 1984, he commented that human rights abuses alongside the persistence of anti-Semitism "serve to remind us that Jews are never the only victims of the world's evil and venality." Pointing out that "we are even confronted by the terrifying phenomenon of Jewish would-be terrorists on the West Bank who strive to implement the racist philosophy expounded by fanatics such as Meir Kahane," the American-born member of the Israeli parliament who promoted a virulently anti-Arab policies, he concluded that "it is not enough for us only to commemorate the past. Rather we must be sensitive to all forms of human suffering, and we must take our place at the forefront of the struggle against racial hatred and oppression of any kind."

Twenty-one years later, on April 17, 2005, he reiterated these views in a speech at Bergen-Belsen on the 60th anniversary of its liberation. The children and grandchildren of the survivors, he declared:

Rosensaft has struggled with the theological implications of the Holocaust. "Where was God when the fires of Auschwitz failed to ignite the universe," he asked at a 1995 commemoration at the U.S. Holocaust Memorial Museum. As reported in The New York Times, he "posed the question of how God could be praised if he did not stop the killing. Then he suggested an answer: 'What if God was not with the killers, with the forces that inflicted Auschwitz on humanity?'" He explained that, "To me, the incredible element of the Holocaust is not the behavior of the murderers, because that is pure evil. It is the behavior of the victims and how they remained human and in many ways behaved in a superhuman manner. ... So the God I choose to pray to was at Auschwitz, but it was not in the manner of the victims' deaths, it was in the way in which they lived." Following the September 11 attacks on New York City in 2001, Rosensaft elaborated on his belief that evil is perpetrated by human beings, not by God:

Rosensaft elaborated on this theme in a guest sermon at Park Avenue Synagogue in New York City on September 7, 2013, the Saturday between Rosh Hashanah (Jewish New Year) and Yom Kippur (Day of Atonement), in which he concluded that as he remembered his parents on the anniversary of their death, "perhaps God did not hide His face from them after all during the years of the Shoah. Perhaps it was a divine spirit within them that enabled them to survive with their humanity intact. And perhaps it is to that God that we should be addressing our prayers during these Days of Awe and throughout the year."

In response to this sermon, Pope Francis wrote to Rosensaft in a personal email message that:

Holocaust Remembrance related activities
In the spring of 1985, Rosensaft was an outspoken critic of President Ronald Reagan's decision to pay homage to fallen German World War II soldiers, including members of Hitler's Waffen-SS, at the military cemetery at Bitburg during a state visit to Germany. Addressing some 5,000 Holocaust survivors and their families in Philadelphia on April 21, 1985, Rosensaft said, "For heaven's sake, let him find another cemetery. There must be at least one in all of Germany that does not contain SS men." On May 5, 1985, Rosensaft organized and led a demonstration of survivors and children of survivors at Bergen-Belsen in protest against the visits that day by President Reagan and West German Chancellor Helmut Kohl to the mass-graves of Bergen-Belsen and Bitburg. Nobel Peace Prize laureate Elie Wiesel wrote in his memoirs that Rosensaft was "one of the very few to strongly oppose President Reagan in the Bitburg affair."

In April 1987, Rosensaft played a major role in convincing the government of Panama not to give sanctuary to Nazi war criminal Karl Linnas, and in ensuring Linnas' deportation from the United States to the Soviet Union. He also "publicly criticized the German government for failing to provide Holocaust survivors with adequate medical coverage while paying generous pensions to veterans of the Waffen SS," and he has challenged the multimillion-dollar fee application submitted by the court-appointed lead settlement counsel in a Holocaust-based class action brought against Swiss banks in the name of survivors.

In the winter of 2002, Rosensaft sharply attacked the Jewish Museum in New York for trivializing the Holocaust in its exhibition, "Mirroring Evil: Nazi Imagery/Recent Art," by including a display of six lifelike busts of the Auschwitz SS doctor Josef Mengele and such works as "Prada Deathcamp" and the "Giftgas Giftset" of poison gas canisters packaged with Chanel, Hermes and Tiffany& Co. logos. "For a Holocaust survivor to hear that a bust of Mengele is on display at the Jewish Museum will at the least cause nightmares," Rosensaft told Alan Cooperman of The Washington Post. "It's the functional equivalent of painting pornography on Torah scrolls and exhibiting it as art. It may well be art. But it is also offensive to many, many people. ... The intellectual reasons of displaying deliberately provocative art have to give way to the far more real pain that this is going to cause for thousands of Holocaust survivors who are still alive."

In 2009, he called on Pope Benedict XVI to publicly condemn the bishop Richard Williamson, a member of the Society of Saint Pius X and a Holocaust denier. He wrote that the faith of Mitt Romney, who is a Mormon, should not be an issue in the 2012 presidential campaign.

In March 2010, Rosensaft sparked a formal investigation by the Maryland authorities into the activities of Menachem Youlus, a rabbi and scribe based in a Washington, D.C., suburb who had falsely claimed to have "rescued" Torah scrolls that had survived the Holocaust, which he sold to synagogues and Jewish centers through his "Save a Torah" charitable organization. "Any exploitation of the Holocaust for crass commercial purposes is appalling," Rosensaft wrote in the New York Post on March 7, 2010. "Creating false Holocaust histories for Torah schools is despicable."

"In late March," reported James Barron of The New York Times on July 26, 2010, Rosensaft wrote to the Maryland attorney general, Douglas F. Gansler, alleging "possible fraud and/or misrepresentation" by Save a Torah. He asked for an investigation into whether Save a Torah had been "soliciting funds under false pretenses". Rosensaft, who is also an adjunct professor at Cornell Law School and teaches a course on World War II war crimes trials, took issue with Rabbi Youlus's description of [a Torah scroll that had allegedly been saved by a priest at Auschwitz who in turn supposedly had given it to Youlus]. "There is no record of anyone even remotely fitting the description of the priest" Rabbi Youlus said had saved it, Rosensaft said in the letter. He also took issue with a Torah that Rabbi Youlus said had been at Bergen-Belsen. Mr. Rosensaft said that Rabbi Youlus's description of finding a Torah beneath a wooden floor in a barracks was not possible. The original buildings at Bergen-Belsen, he said, were burned to stop a typhus epidemic and the survivors were moved to a former German military installation nearby in May 1945. Mr. Rosensaft said that he was born in that installation in 1948 and returned many times to visit.

In July 2010, Save a Torah entered into an agreement with the Maryland authorities under which it would cease to provide Holocaust provenances for Torah scrolls unless "there is documentation or an independent verifiable witness to such history." The following year, Youlus was arrested in Manhattan and charged with fraud by the US Attorney for the Southern District of New York. Five months later, when Youlus pleaded guilty to mail fraud and wire fraud in a US federal court, Rosensaft told The New York Times that, "I am gratified that this charlatan will now be fully exposed, as a matter of law, as a petty crook."

In December 2012, after Youlus had been sentenced to 51 months in jail, Rosensaft wrote told the Jewish Telegraphic Agency (JTA) that, "This is extremely important because it sends a message that Holocaust deniers and Holocaust memory exploiters are not part of accepted society. There is very little if any difference between a Holocaust denier and someone like Youlus who exploits Holocaust memories in order to enrich himself." Rosensaft then wrote in the New York Jewish Week that,

In 2012, he denounced immigration restrictionists Peter Brimelow and Pat Buchanan as racists who should be shunned from mainstream political debate.

In a June 4, 2012 Huffington Post article in which he defended President Obama's reference to "a Polish death camp" at a Presidential Medal of Freedom presentation as "an innocent phraseological error," Rosensaft, citing a publication of the United States Holocaust Memorial Museum, wrote that "thousands of Polish political, religious and intellectual leaders were also killed by the Germans during World War II" alongside millions of Jews, and that "Between 70,000 and 75,000 non-Jewish Poles are estimated to have perished at Auschwitz alone." In the same Huffington Post article, Rosensaft pointed out that Polish government officials "have a valid historiographical point" in insisting that German annihilation and concentration camps such as Auschwitz and Treblinka not be referred to as "Polish death camps," and he noted that in 2006, he had "publicly supported the Polish Government's request that the United Nations Educational, Scientific and Cultural Organization formally change the name of the site of the most notorious of the World War II camps on UNESCO's World Heritage List from 'Auschwitz Death Camp' to 'former Nazi German Auschwitz-Birkenau Death Camp.'"

Poems Born in Bergen-Belsen
Menachem Rosensaft's book, Poems Born in Bergen-Belsen,  published by Kelsay Book in April 2021, received broad critical acclaim.  Kirkus Reviews called the book “a haunting and unrelenting volume of Holocaust-centered works,” with the reviewer writing that, “Rosensaft's poems are sparse and measured, filled with images of ghosts, fires, ash, and darkness; they're rarely portraits of quiet grief. More often, he animates the words with simmering anger as they voice frustration toward perpetrators, bystanders, and even God.”  Micah Zevin wrote in Booklist, that Rosensaft's “memoiristic poems infiltrate the readers' minds with evocative, lyrical lines flowing one into another like the chanting of bible passages or a lament,” forcing readers “to travel to a past they've never experienced, and to become immersed, alongside the author, in faith, doubt, and pain while offering tribute to the fallen.”

Michael Oren, former Israeli ambassador to the United States, described Poems Born in Bergen-Belsen as “an important resource for students of the Holocaust, for educators, and spiritual leaders. But it is also a work of literature that deserves to be judged on its artistic merits, which are formidable.”  Holocaust scholar Michael Berenbaum wrote in the Jerusalem Post:

 
Reviewing the book in the National Catholic Register, Peter Jesserer Smith wrote:

In a September 2021 interview with Al Jazeera, Menachem Rosensaft explained why he writes poetry:

Israel / Palestinian peace process
Rosensaft, who was known to support the Israeli peace movement, was elected national president of the Labor Zionist Alliance in early 1988. Shortly thereafter, he confronted Israeli Prime Minister Yitzhak Shamir at a meeting of the Conference of Presidents of Major Jewish Organizations. Shamir had called on the American Jewish leadership to support his government's hard-line policies and criticized those who publicly espoused more dovish positions. Rosensaft responded by noting that since Israelis themselves were divided, "Why should we be accused of disloyalty?" "We support Israel fully and identify with her totally," he explained, referring to the more liberal Jewish groups that belonged to the Presidents Conference. "But that does not mean we have to agree with every single decision or policy set by the government or a particular minister. Voicing our concerns does not indicate disloyalty."

In December 1988, he was one of five American Jews in Stockholm, Sweden, who met with Yasir Arafat and other senior leaders of the Palestine Liberation Organization, resulting in the PLO's first public recognition of Israel. Writing in Newsweek, he explained that despite an initial reluctance to participate in such a meeting, he concluded that since he had urged others to negotiate with the PLO, "I really had no choice. Since I wanted others to talk to the enemy, I had to be willing to do so as well – not going would be a betrayal of my principles both as a Jew and as a Zionist." For Rosensaft, the very beginning of dialogue was a major accomplishment. "There are miles to go," he said. "But for God's sake, let's start talking. When you talk, you de-demonize the enemy."

A year later, in an open letter to Arafat also published in Newsweek, he voiced his dismay at the fact that the Palestinian leader had done nothing to move the peace process forward since the Stockholm meeting. "I knew, of course," he wrote, "that you had not overnight turned into Mother Teresa or Albert Schweitzer. Still, you have regrettably failed to take any substantive steps to persuade the Israeli public that their destruction has ceased to be the PLO's ultimate objective. ... If you truly want peace, and I hope you do, you and your colleagues must do far more than you have done to date to demonstrate the sincerity of your intentions. You must renounce terrorism in fact, not merely in rhetoric."

In October 2000, Rosensaft expressed his utter disillusionment with Arafat. "We believed him," Rosensaft wrote in The Washington Post, "when he said that he and the PLO were committed to a political solution to the Israeli-Palestinian conflict. We believed him when he proclaimed an end to terrorism. We were wrong. ... Of course the Palestinians were entitled to self-determination – even independence—but only on terms of mutual respect. The Palestinians' claims of nationhood could not stand separate and apart from their acknowledgment that Israelis are entitled to precisely the same rights. Arafat and his colleagues gave lip service to these lofty sentiments. We believed them. We were wrong. ... Perhaps, in time, the Palestinians will realize that a different leader will better serve them and their cause. Perhaps they will realize that stabbing and stomping Israeli soldiers to death and then parading their mutilated bodies in an obscene triumph is not acceptable behavior in the 21st century. Perhaps. But then, we also believe in the eventual arrival of the Messiah. In the meantime, those of us who wanted so desperately to see Arafat as a positive, constructive presence of any kind must reiterate over and over again: We were wrong."

Srebrenica  Massacre

Rosensaft publicly confronted the Simon Wiesenthal Center's chief Nazi-hunter and director for Eastern European Affairs Israeli Holocaust historian Efraim Zuroff for denying that the Srebrenica massacre was genocide, arguing that: 

He also responded to and criticized denialist arguments, particularly underlining those made by Steven T. Katz, Efraim Zuroff, Yehuda Bauer, and William Schabas, in a long essay titled "Ratko Mladić’s Genocide Conviction, and Why it Matters", written by Rosensaft and published by Tablet magazine on a day Ratko Mladić was found guilty of "genocide, extermination, murder, and other crimes against humanity and war crimes" at the ICTY, and sentenced to life imprisonment.
To one of the most important and the most often repeated denialists' arguments – number, intent, and combination of these two, depending on occasion and context – Rosensaft responded with meticulous deconstruction of judicial activity, and with analysis of key convictions. He pointed that the ICTY's Krstić Appeals Chamber unequivocally held that the number of victims was not a determinative factor in concluding whether or not a genocide had occurred, and affirmed the Trial Chamber's conclusion that "the Srebrenica massacre was indeed a genocide because it was an essential element of the intent to destroy the Muslim population of Eastern Bosnia as a whole."

In July 2021, Rosensaft wrote a detailed critique of the report issued by the purportedly “independent” Republika Srpska-appointed commission headed by the Israeli academic Gideon Greif that concluded that the slaughter of Bosnian Muslims at Srebrenica did not constitute a genocide.  “As the son of two survivors of Auschwitz and Bergen-Belsen who were deeply committed to transmitting to future generations evidence of the crimes perpetrated against European Jewry during the Holocaust,” Rosensaft wrote,

Greif's report, Rosensaft wrote in Haaretz, “repeatedly casts the Bosniaks as aggressors and the Bosnian Serbs as victims, in a rewriting of history reminiscent of Third Reich Propaganda Minister Joseph Goebbels’ justifications for Nazi German antisemitism.”

In December 2021, Rosensaft commended the German government for rescinding its decision to honor Greif for his earlier Holocaust-related work. “The German government’s decision not to honor Gideon Greif with the Order of Merit of the Federal Republic of Germany is wholly appropriate,” Rosensaft told Haaretz. “Gideon Greif has emerged as the poster child for Srebrenica genocide denial, and honoring him, even with respect to his prior academic work … would have been tantamount to endorsing his wholly specious and both morally and jurisprudentially offensive distortion of the facts regarding the slaughter of Bosniak Muslims.”

Rosensaft also sharply criticized Greif for saying in an interview that the German Government’s decision not to give him this award was “a black stain on Germany. They are murdering the Holocaust victims for a second time.”  Rosensaft wrote in Haaretz: “It takes an acute disconnect from reality to compare genocide with the cancellation of an award. To assert such a grotesque and wholly unconscionable equivalence would suggest a delusional mindset, one that perversely places a perceived slight to one’s outsized, but evidently hyper-fragile, ego in the same category and on the same level as mass murder.”

References

Living people
1948 births
Columbia Law School alumni
Jewish American attorneys
Johns Hopkins University alumni
New York (state) lawyers
American Zionists
German emigrants to the United States
Syracuse University faculty
21st-century American Jews